USS LST-452 was a United States Navy  used in the Asiatic-Pacific Theater during World War II.

Construction
LST-452 was laid down on 20 July 1942, under Maritime Commission (MARCOM) contract, MC hull 972, by  Kaiser Shipyards, Vancouver, Washington; launched on 10 October 1942; and commissioned on 16 January 1943.

Service history
During the war, LST-452 was assigned to the Pacific Theater of Operations. She took part in  the Eastern New Guinea operations, the Lae occupation in September 1943, the Finschhafen occupation in September 1943, and the Saidor occupation in January 1944; the Bismarck Archipelago operations, the Cape Gloucester, New Britain, landings from December 1943 through February 1944, and the Admiralty Islands landings in March 1944; the Hollandia operation in April and May 1944; the Western New Guinea operations, the Biak Islands operation in May and June 1944, the Cape Sansapor operation in July and August 1944, and the Morotai landing in September 1944; the Leyte landings in October 1944; the Lingayen Gulf landings in January 1945; and the Balikpapan operation in June and July 1945.

Post-war service
Following the war, LST-452 saw service in China until mid-May 1946. She returned to the United States and was decommissioned on 12 June 1946, and struck from the Navy list on 3 July, that same year. On 5 December 1947, the ship was sold to Bosey, Philippines.

Honors and awards
LST-452 earned seven battle stars and the Navy Unit Commendation  for her gallant World War II service.

Notes 

Citations

Bibliography 

Online resources

External links

 

LST-1-class tank landing ships
World War II amphibious warfare vessels of the United States
1942 ships
S3-M2-K2 ships
Ships built in Vancouver, Washington